Reed Mill is a tower mill in Kingston, Kent, England that was built in the early nineteenth century and worked until 1915, after which the mill was derelict. In 2010–11 the mill was converted and extended to form residential accommodation.

History

Reed mill was built in the early nineteenth century. It was marked on the 1858-72 Ordnance Survey map. The mill was working until 28 March 1915 when it was tailwinded and the cap and sails were blown off. The fantail was inoperative at the time as a new gear was being cast for it. As it would have cost in excess of £300 to repair the mill was abandoned. Before conversion, the mill was an empty tower, all machinery having been removed.  In 2010-11 the mill was converted and extended to form residential accommodation by RJ Gibbs and Sons LTD. A new-build barn and glass conservatory were built adjoining the mill. The conversion was covered in the first programme of the second series of Channel 4's The Restoration Man programme.

Description

Reed Mill is a four-storey tower mill, formerly with a Kentish-style cap carrying four patent sails. It was winded by a fantail. There was no stage. The mill drove three pairs of millstones.

Millers
Daniel Gouger 1825 - circa 1865
F J Fagg - 1915

References for above:-

See also
 http://archiver.rootsweb.ancestry.com/th/read/Isle-of-Thanet/2005-09/1126447767

References

External links
Windmill World page on the mill.

Industrial buildings completed in the 19th century
Windmills in Kent
Grinding mills in the United Kingdom
Tower mills in the United Kingdom
Residential buildings completed in 2011